The Transport Act 1985 was an Act of Parliament in the United Kingdom. It introduced privatised and deregulated bus services throughout Great Britain and came into effect in October 1986.

The Act was created as a response to growing concern about the environmental effect the private transportation was having and the public's objection to an increase in road construction. The Act was introduced by Nicholas Ridley and it committed to reduce the amount the public paid for commercial objects. This was achieved by reducing the control governments had of bus systems and reducing the subsidies to bus companies. The Conservative government also believed the removal of subsidies and local government control would lead to an increase in competition between companies. The deregulation of Buses applied throughout Great Britain, excluding bus services in Greater London, and was led by the Conservative government. Public transport remains under direct public control in Northern Ireland.

Deregulation and Elimination of Barriers

Proposal 
In 1984 a proposal to deregulate local bus services was published in the white paper Buses and in more detailed consultation papers. Part I of the Act brought these proposals into effect.

Deregulation, elimination of barriers, and the transfer to the private sector were some of the major changes the Act established.  Privatisation and bus deregulation came into effect on 26 October 1986. Local authorities were required to transfer their municipally-owned bus services to separate companies. Although most of these companies have since been privatised, with the exception of Lothian Buses in Edinburgh; a few other municipal bus companies remain today. The Act also mandated that local governments publish statements of their own policies for bus services deemed socially vital that were not operated by commercial companies.

London 
London faced a different type of deregulation. The standard deregulation that applied to other cities in the United Kingdom was not applied to bus services in Greater London; instead, the Act brought about a system of franchised routes operated by private companies but managed by London Buses Ltd. This meant that, although the bus companies in London were privatised, London's government still retained the ability to regulate the companies. At the time the Act was put into place, the London bus companies were governed by the London Regional Transport Act 1984.

Transport Act 1985: Deregulation (Part I) 
Part I of the Act eradicated, excluding London, the need for the required road service licence throughout the United Kingdom. Part I replaced service licensing with a system of registration. This caused licensing authorities losing many of their powers and made it possible for operators to register new routes. For an operator to register a new route the licensed operator had to supply the traffic commissioner with information of the proposed route, the timeline for the trip, stopping arrangements, the vehicles to be used, and the terminal points. In accordance with the Act the traffic commissioner had to receive the registration at least 42 days prior to when the route is to be run. It was mandatory for the notice to go through the traffic commissioner for a licensed bus operator to operate. After approval, the operator was required to run the route according to the specifications provided in the registration.

Deregulation also led to firms being able to charge any fares they wish, run routes, and freely enter and leave the market. This was accomplished by reducing the amount of subsidies local governments could provide for services.

Transport Act 1985: Privatisation (Part II) 
Privatisation proposals were put forth to change the structure of the bus industry. The bus industry was managed mainly by public sector companies in the years prior to 1985. Privatisation was introduced by the Conservative government as a way to achieve better access to private capital and more committed management. In order to achieve this goal, the Conservative government made it so local governments could only provide subsidies for services and prohibited subsidies that would promote low fares.

Aftermath 
The Act changed how bus services were run in the United Kingdom. The Act introduced the largest change in the framework of bus services in over five decades and it replaced the prior publicly owned and highly regulated bus service with a largely competitive commercial system. Additionally, the removal of subsidies made it so different firms had to bid on the right to operate with subsidized services.

See also
Bus deregulation in Great Britain
Municipal bus company
List of former municipal bus companies of the United Kingdom

References

United Kingdom Acts of Parliament 1985
1985 in transport
Bus transport in the United Kingdom
Transport policy in the United Kingdom
Economic liberalization
History of transport in the United Kingdom
Transport legislation
Privatisation in the United Kingdom